Two vessels of the Royal Canadian Navy have been named HMCS Rainbow, after the rainbow.

 , an  protected cruiser operated by the Royal Navy from 1893 to 1909 as HMS Rainbow, transferred to Canada in 1910, and operated until 1920

See also
 , nine ships of the Royal Navy, including the first HMCS Rainbow
 , a distilling ship and submarine tender of the United States Navy

Royal Canadian Navy ship names

fr:NCSM Rainbow